Zeegse is a village in the Dutch province of Drenthe. It is a part of the municipality of Tynaarlo, and lies about 9 km northeast of Assen.

The village was first mentioned in 1225 as Otto de Segese. The etymology is unclear. Zeegse was home to 51 people in 1840.

References

Populated places in Drenthe
Tynaarlo